Brenthia gregori is a moth of the family Choreutidae. It is known from Cuba and the Virgin Islands.

The length of the forewings is about 5.5 mm.[0.55 cm]

References

Brenthia